The New Haven Eagles were a professional ice hockey team that played in New Haven, Connecticut. The Eagles were one of five inaugural franchises in the Canadian American Hockey League, and a founding member of the American Hockey League.

History
The Eagles finished in first place during their inaugural season, with a record of 18–14–0, and also won the league championship in the playoffs.  New Haven played in the Can-Am league from 1926 to 1936, when the league became part of the International-American Hockey League. The Eagles played in the new I-AHL from 1936 to 1940, when the league was renamed the American Hockey League. New Haven continued in the AHL until 1943. The team suspended operations for two seasons during World War II. The Eagles were resurrected for the 1945–46 season.

From 1946 to 1950 the franchise was known as the New Haven Ramblers. The team was reverted to the Eagles name for the 1950–51 season.  However, the team folded in the middle of the season after only 28 games with a record of 5–23–0.

Other New Haven teams
Several other teams called New Haven their home. Three teams from the Eastern Hockey League include the New Haven Tomahawks (1951–52), New Haven Nutmegs (1952–53), and the New Haven Blades (1954–1972). Two subsequent franchises playing the AHL were based in New Haven; the New Haven Nighthawks (1972–1992), who were renamed the New Haven Senators (1992–93), Beast of New Haven (1997–1999), and most recently the UHL's New Haven Knights (2000–2002).

Season-by-season results
 New Haven Eagles 1926–1936 (Canadian-American Hockey League)
 New Haven Eagles 1936–1940 (International-American Hockey League)
 New Haven Eagles 1940–1943
 New Haven Eagles 1945–1946
 New Haven Ramblers 1946–1950
 New Haven Eagles 1950–1951

Regular season

Playoffs

References

See also 
Professional Hockey In Connecticut

New Haven Ramblers
Ice hockey clubs established in 1926
Ice hockey teams in Connecticut
Sports clubs disestablished in 1951
Eastern Hockey League teams
Canadian-American Hockey League teams
Boston Bruins minor league affiliates
Montreal Canadiens minor league affiliates
New York Americans minor league affiliates
New York Rangers minor league affiliates
1926 establishments in Connecticut
1951 disestablishments in Connecticut